Garuda is a divine bird in Hindu and Buddhist mythology.

Garuda may also refer to:

Film
Garuda (2004 film), a 2004 Thai monster film
Garuda (2022 film), an Indian Kannada-language film by Dhanakumar K

Fiction
 Garuda (video game character), a character from the Street Fighter EX series of games
 Ike Garuda, a character in The Transmutation of Ike Garuda
 Garudas, a fictional race of humanoid avians from Bas-Lag in Perdido Street Station by China Miéville
 Garuda, a villain in Combattler V
 Jet Garuda, a mecha in Chōjin Sentai Jetman
 Garuda, a warship in Godzilla vs. Mechagodzilla II
 Garuda, a recurring enemy in the Final Fantasy video games series; see Final Fantasy XIV
 Garuda, a villain in Lost Girl
 Garuda 1 and Garuda 2, characters in Ace Combat 6: Fires of Liberation
 Garuda, a fictional floating country in the 2015 action-adventure video game Rodea the Sky Soldier

Other
 Garuda of Gour, a fourteenth-century prince
 Garuda 1, a satellite
 Garuda Contingent, Indonesian peacekeepers serving under the United Nations
 Garuda Indonesia, the national airline of Indonesia
 Garuda Party, a political party in Indonesia 
 Garuda Upanishad, one of 108 Upanishadic Hindu scriptures
 GARUDA, an Indian grid-computing initiative
 INS Garuda, an Indian Naval Air Station in Kochi, Kerala
 VAQ-134 or the Garudas, a United States Navy EA-18G Growler squadron
 Garuda Pancasila, the National emblem of Indonesia
 Garuda, a bus service operated by Andhra Pradesh State Road Transport Corporation
 Garuda Linux, an Arch Linux based operating system

See also
 Garud Commando Force, an elite special forces unit of the Indian Air Force
 Garudamon, a Digimon
 The Dream of Garuda, a 1994 Japanese film